The Aventine Secession was the withdrawal of the parliament opposition, mainly comprising the Italian Socialist Party, Italian Liberal Party, Italian People's Party and Italian Communist Party, from the Chamber of Deputies in 1924–25, following the murder of the deputy Giacomo Matteotti by fascists on June 10, 1924.

The secession was named after the Aventine Secession in ancient Rome. This act of protest heralded the assumption of total power by Benito Mussolini and his National Fascist Party and the establishment of a one-party dictatorship in Italy. It was unsuccessful in opposing the National Fascist Party, and after two years the Chamber of Deputies ruled that the 123 Aventine deputies had forfeited their positions. In the following years, many of the "Aventinian" deputies were forced into exile or imprisoned.

Background

In 1923, the Acerbo Law replaced proportional representation.  It meant that the largest party, providing it had at least 25% of the vote, gained 2/3 of the parliamentary seats. Following the elections in April 1924, Mussolini obtained 64.9% of the vote, giving him a clear majority under either system.

After his outspoken accusation of the Fascist Party's underhand methods of political corruption and voter intimidation, the Socialist leader Giacomo Matteotti was abducted and murdered by Amerigo Dumini and various other thugs whose names were linked to the Fascist Party. There is considerable dispute among historians as to the level (if any) of Mussolini's knowledge and involvement.

The resulting uproar after the Matteotti murder left Mussolini vulnerable, having been forced to dismiss numerous members of his entourage, including General De Bono, Chief of Police and Head of the MVSN. In late July 1924, the Socialists, Christian democrats and some Liberals began a boycott of Parliament, with the aim of forcing the King to dismiss Mussolini.

The secession
On June 26, 1924, around 130 of the Italian opposition deputies (including members of the Italian People's Party, Unitary Socialist Party, Italian Socialist Party, Communist Party of Italy, Social Democratic Party, Italian Republican Party, Democratic Liberal Party, and Sardinian Action Party) met in the Sala della Lupa of the Palazzo Montecitorio. There, they decided to abandon their parliamentary work since the government had not clarified its position on the disappearance of Giacomo Matteotti.

Giovanni Amendola of the Democratic Liberal Party published the reasoning behind the secession in Il Mondo:

The non-violent opposition to the government was also promoted by socialist deputy Filippo Turati. On 27 June 1924, he commemorated Matteotti at the Palazzo Montecitorio in front of the other secessionists.

Other than Mussolini's National Fascist Party, the parties that did not participate in the secession included the Italian Liberal Party, the Peasants' Party of Italy, and the Lists of Slavs and Germans.

The "Aventinians" were mostly against a popular insurrection to depose Mussolini's government. At the same time, the protesting deputies did not coordinate with the other opponents of fascism that did not join the secession and remained in the Italian parliament. The secessionists believed that, before the fascists' link to Matteotti's kidnapping and presumed death became clear, the Italian king would dismiss Mussolini and dissolve the Chamber to call for new elections. None of that happened.

Officer Dumini was arrested on July 12, 1924, at the Roma Termini railway station, as he was preparing to leave for the north of Italy and was brought to the Regina Coeli prison. On August 16, the body of the Matteotti was found in the forest of Quartarella, which agitated the already tense political crisis.

Between August and October 1924, some Aventinian leaders, including Giovanni Amendola, seemed to share the militant insurrectional line proposed by antifascist group Italia Libera. Italia libera secretly brought to Rome an armed group of several thousand men dubbed the "Amici del Popolo". In an executive report by the Communist International, Palmiro Togliatti estimated there were 7,000 men in this Roman group, and he believed that around 4,000 could be controlled by Communist infiltrators.

On September 12, 1924, the militant communist  killed the fascist deputy  to avenge Matteotti, which increased the rigidity of the government position. On October 20, the communist leader Antonio Gramsci proposed that the Aventinian opposition should form an "anti-parliament" to signal the great distance between the secessionists and a Parliament composed only of fascists. The proposal was not executed, however.

In the last months of 1924, Amendola decided to abandon the previous insurrectionary position as too unrealistic. He returned to his initial choice to rely on the support of the king to undermine Mussolini. Through the grand master of the Grand Orient of Italy, Amendola came into possession of two letters that accused Mussolini as ordering the killing of Matteotti. Filipelli accused policeman Amerigo Dumini, politician Cesare Rossi, general Emilio De Bono, and Benito Mussolini himself for being involved in the killing. He claimed the kidnapping had been organized by the internal political police of the National Fascist Party, the Ceka, which was directed by Rossi. The second letter was written by Rossi himself.

After a meeting together, Torrigiani and Ivanoe Bonomi (both Masons) decided that Bonomi, who had free access to the Quirinal Palace, should bring the letters to be seen by Victor Emmanuel III of Italy and convince him to dismiss Mussolini and form a transitional military government. The meeting went ahead at the beginning of November, 1924, but had no result. The king, in fact, realizing the terrible accusations contained in the letters, handed them back to Bonomi.

The party comprised 11 deputies, 16 ex-deputies, and 11 senators.

Fearing that Vittorio Emanuele III would consider his dismissal, Mussolini pronounced his . Through it, he assumed further political, moral, and historical responsibilities. Recalling Article 47 of the statues of the Chamber that foresaw the possibility of a king's minister being accused by deputies, Mussolini formally asked Parliament to make an indictment against him. However, this could not happen without the Aventinian deputies re-entering the Chamber and at least some votes from the majority of fascists deputies. Still, there was heated discussion of the proposal among the National Fascist Party members.

Outcome
Without the socialists, the vote of no 'confidence' in Mussolini was a failure. The Aventinian opposition failed to react, both due to the immediate repressions ordered by Mussolini and for its internal divisions. It preferred to pursue changing the public opinion on fascism, rather than re-entering Parliament and fighting as a minority party.

King Victor Emmanuel III was disinclined to invoke further violence from the Fascist squads, and thus allowed Mussolini to keep his position as Prime Minister. The Secession actually aided Mussolini in his consolidation of power by eliminating all meaningful parliamentary opposition and depriving the King of any excuse to dismiss him. With the opposition thus reduced to inaction, Mussolini set about building his fascist state.

In January 1925, Mussolini declared a de facto dictatorship and started a series of repressive measures designed to destroy opposition. The groups of Italia libera were suppressed between January 3 and 6 of that year. Acting as a high court, the Italian Senate gave a ruling on Emilio De Bono, solicited by Luigi Albertini and other Catholics. The ruling was archived after six months after Filippelli retracted his testimony from March 24. Cesare Rossi was acquitted and released from prison in December 1925. On July 20, Giovanni Amendola was attacked by fascist squads in The Tuscan town of Pieve a Nievole. He never recovered from the attack and died in Cannes in April 1926.

On January 16, 1926, some of the populist and democratic-socialist Members of Parliament entered the Palazzo Montecitorio to assist with the mourning ceremonies for Margherita of Savoy. Shortly after, fascist parliamentarians violently expelled them from the hall. The day after, Mussolini accused the parliamentarians who had been expelled, accusing them of indecency against the queen.

Between March 16 and 24, the trial against Dumini and other people implicated in Matteotti's death was held. The judgment closed with three absolutions and three condemnations for pre-meditated homicide (among them Dumini), with sentences of 5 years, 11 months, and 20 days.

On November 9, 1926, the Chamber reopened to ratify the exceptional laws and also to deliberate on the secession of the 123 Aventinian parliamentarians, as well as the dissident journalist .

In the first motion, presented by Roberto Farinacci, debated the Aventinians and their parliamentary secession, excluding the communists who had returned to the hall. Augusto Turati then amended the motion to include the communists as well. Due to the previous regal orders, the only opposition members present were the 6 members belonging to the Giolittiana faction: already, the night before, Antonio Gramsci had been arrested, in violation of the parliamentary immunity still in force. Through the motions, it was declared that the Aventinian secessionists had forfeited their seats in the Chamber.

Socialist Filippo Turati successfully fled to Corsica in December 1926 on a motorboat lead by Italian antifascist Italo Oxilia, with the help of Carlo Rosselli, Ferruccio Parri, Sandro Pertini. In 1932, he died in exile in Paris. After Gramsci's arrest, he spent 8 years in a Turin prison.

The socialist Giuseppe Romita, the communist , and the republican  each spent years in jail. Whoever was not imprisoned had to abandon their political life until the fall of fascism.

After the fascist regime fell, the Constituent Assembly of Italy of the new Italian Republic created the Constitution of Italy on January 1, 1948. One article specified the criteria for the "Senators by right" of the first legislature. Other than those elected in the Senate of the Kingdom of Italy, the article added those who were "declared forfeited in the session of the Chamber of November 9, 1926." As a result, 106 senators were nominated, in addition to the 237 selected in the 1948 Italian general election.

See also
 :Category:Italian Aventinian secessionists for partial list
  for full list
 Conflict of the Orders
 Italian antifascism
 OVRA
 The Assassination of Matteotti

References

Bibliography
 
 
 
 

Italian Fascism
1924 in Italy
Italian Aventinian secessionists
Anti-fascism in Italy